Duns may refer to:

 Duns, Scottish Borders, a town in Berwickshire, Scotland
 Duns railway station
 Duns F.C., a football club
 Duns RFC, a rugby football club
 Battle of Duns, an engagement fought in 1372
 Duns Scotus ( 1265/66–1308), Scottish philosopher
Duns or Dunsman, see Scotism
 Düns, municipality in the Austrian state of Vorarlberg
 DUNS (Data Universal Numbering System)

People with the surname 
 Jeremy Duns (born 1973), a British author
 Len Duns (1916–1989), an English footballer

See also
Duns Creek, New South Wales, Australia
Duns Tew, Oxfordshire, England
Dun (disambiguation)